Walter Montgomery may refer to:

Walter Montgomery (actor) (1827–1871), American-British actor
Walter Montgomery (wrestler) (1895–1950), Canadian wrestler
Walter A. Montgomery (1845–1921), Civil War soldier and Justice of the North Carolina Supreme Court

See also
Walter Montgomery Jackson (1863–1923), American encyclopedia publisher